This is a list of Italian comics (fumetti).

A
 Alan Ford by Max Bunker (author) and Magnus (artist)

B
 La Bionda ("The Blonde") by Franco Saudelli

C
 Calavera by Enrico Teodorani and Joe Vigil
 Il Gioco ("Click") by Milo Manara
 Cocco Bill by Benito Jacovitti
 Comandante Mark by Gianni Bono
 Corto Maltese by Hugo Pratt

D
 Diabolik by Angela e Luciana Giussani
 Djustine by Enrico Teodorani
 Druuna by Serpieri
 Dylan Dog by Tiziano Sclavi

F
 Fort Wheeling by Hugo Pratt
 Frigidaire, anthology

G
 Geky Dor by Andrea Lavezzolo (writer) and Andrea Bresciani (artist) 
 Gim Toro by Andrea Lavezzolo (writer) and Edgardo Dell'Acqua (artist)
 Giuseppe Bergman by Milo Manara
 Il Grande Blek by Editoriale Dardo

J
 Jesuit Joe by Hugo Pratt
 Julia by Giancarlo Berardi (writer)

K
 Ken Parker by Giancarlo Berardi (writer) and Ivo Milazzo (artist)
 Kinowa by Andrea Lavezzolo (writer) and EsseGesse (artist)
 Klaus and Elmer by Massimo Perissinotto and Maurizio Ercole
 Kriminal by Max Bunker and Magnus

L
 Lo Sconosciuto ("The Specialist") by Magnus

M
 Magico Vento by Gianfranco Manfredi (writer)
 Martin Mystère by Alfredo Castelli (author) and Giancarlo Alessandrini (artist)
 Milady nel 3000 by Magnus
 Morgan by Hugo Pratt

N
 Nathan Never by Michele Medda, Antonio Serra and Bepi Vigna (since 1991)

P
 Il Piccolo Ranger by Andrea Lavezzolo (writer) and Francesco Gamba (artist)

R
 RanXerox by Tanino Liberatore and Stefano Tamburini
 Rat-Man by Leo Ortolani

S
 Satanik by Max Bunker and Magnus
 Sergeant Kirk by Hugo Pratt
 Sky Doll by Alessandro Barbucci and Barbara Canepa
 Sturmtruppen by Bonvi
 The Scorpions of the Desert (Gli scorpioni del deserto) by Hugo Pratt

T
 Tex Willer by Gian Luigi Bonelli (author) and Aurelio Galleppini (artist)
 Tony Falco by Andrea Lavezzolo (writer) and Andrea Bresciani (artist)

V
 Valentina by Guido Crepax

W
 Wheela by Enrico Teodorani
 W.I.T.C.H. by Elisabetta Gnone
 Winx Club by Iginio Straffi

Z
 Zagor'' by Sergio Bonelli

References

Italian comics titles
Italy